East Lynne may refer to:

Places
East Lynne, Missouri

Arts and entertainment
East Lynne, an 1861 novel
East Lynne (1912 film), starring James Cruze and released by Thanhouser Film Corporation
East Lynne (1913 film), starring Blanche Forsythe and Fred Paul
East Lynne (1916 film), starring Theda Bara and one of her few films to survive
East Lynne (1921 film), starring Edward Earle and Mabel Ballin
East Lynne (1922 film), an Australian film directed by Charles Hardy
East Lynne (1925 film) starring Alma Rubens
East Lynne (1931 film), directed by Frank Lloyd and nominated for an Oscar for Best Picture
East Lynne (1976 film), directed by Barney Colehan and Philip Grout
East Lynne (1982 TV film), directed by David Green and starring Martin Shaw

See also
East Lynne on the Western Front, a 1931 comedy film
 East Lyn River, and
 East Lyn Valley, both in Devon